"Let Me Be Me" is a song by Jessica Mauboy

Music
Let Me Be Me, album by Cheryl Pepsii Riley 2006

Songs
 "Let Me Be Me", song by Tammy Wynette	1979
 "Let Me Be Me", song by White Lion album Return of the Pride  
 "Let Me Be Me", song by   Carmen and Camille from Two
 "Just Let Me Be Me", by     Soul Serenade (Gloria Lynne album)